Estonian Philharmonic Chamber Choir (EPCC) is a professional choir based in Estonia.  It was founded in 1981 by Tõnu Kaljuste, who was its conductor for twenty years. In 2001, Paul Hillier followed Kaljuste's tenure, becoming the EPCC's principal conductor and artistic director until September 2008, when Daniel Reuss took over the task. Since 2014 the choir's principal conductor has been Kaspars Putniņš. The repertoire of the EPCC ranges from Gregorian Chant to modern works, particularly those of the Estonian composers Arvo Pärt and Veljo Tormis.  The group has been nominated for numerous Grammy Awards, and has won the Grammy Award for Best Choral Performance twice: in 2007 with Arvo Pärt's Da pacem and in 2014 with Pärt's Adam's Lament, the latter was shared with Tui Hirv & Rainer Vilu, Sinfonietta Riga & Tallinn Chamber Orchestra; Latvian Radio Choir & Vox Clamantis. In 2018 Estonian Philharmonic Chamber Choir won the prestigious Gramophone Award with its recording of Magnificat and Nunc dimittis by Arvo Pärt and Psalms of Repentance by Alfred Schnittke (conductor Kaspars Putniņš).

Discography

Gesualdo/Erkki-Sven Tüür/Brett Dean (2015)
Gregory Rose: Danse macabre (2015)
Sibelius: Complete Works for Mixed Choir (2015)
Siin on Ilus Elada (2014)
Baltic Runes (2010)
Arvo Pärt: In Principio (2009)
Toivo Tulev: Songs (2008)
Scattered Rhymes: Tarik O'Regan & Guillaume de Machaut (2008)
A New Joy (2006)
Arvo Pärt: Da pacem (2006) - won Grammy Award for Best Choral Performance 2007
Baltic Voices 3 (2005)
Lepo Sumera: Mushroom Cantata (2005)
Rachmaninov: All-Night Vigil (2005)
Baltic Voices 2 (2004)
The Powers of Heaven (2003)
Antonio Vivaldi: Gloria, Settings from the Mass and Vespers (2003)
Baltic Voices 1 (2002)
Antonio Vivaldi: Salmi a due cori (2002)
Wolfgang Amadeus Mozart: Litaniae (2000)
Wolfgang Amadeus Mozart: Vesperae et Litania (2000)
Veljo Tormis: Laulu palju (Liederhaufen) (2000)
Paul Giger: Ignis (2000)
Veljo Tormis: Litany to Thunder (1999)
Karl August Hermann, Raimo Kangro, Leelo Tungal: Eesti lauleldused (Estonian Singspiels) (1999)
Arvo Pärt: Kanon Pokajanen (1998)
Arvo Pärt: Beatus (1997)
Veljo Tormis: Casting a Spell (1996)
Arvo Pärt: Litany (1996)
Erkki-Sven Tüür: Crystallisatio (1996)
Kaunimad laulud (The Most Beautiful Songs) (1994)
Arvo Pärt: Te Deum (1993)
Veljo Tormis: Forgotten Peoples (1992)
Rachmaninoff: Liturgy of St. John Chrysostom (Rachmaninoff) (2022)

External links 

 
 

Musical groups established in 1981
Contemporary classical music ensembles
National choirs
Estonian choirs
1981 establishments in Estonia
Estonian classical music groups